The National Shrine and Parish of Saint Anne, commonly known as the Santa Ana Shrine or Hagonoy Church, is an 18th-century, Baroque church located at Brgy. Santo Niño, Hagonoy, Bulacan, Philippines. The parish church, under the aegis of Saint Anne, is under the jurisdiction of the Roman Catholic Diocese of Malolos. It was declared a National Shrine in 1991. In 1981, a marker bearing a brief history of the church was installed on the church by the National Historical Institute, precursor of the National Historical Commission of the Philippines.

History

Parish history
Sources tell that Hagonoy was already a thriving community before the arrival of the Spanish Missionaries with claims that the local chieftain of prehistoric Hagonoy, along with the chieftains of Betis and Macabebe, confronted Miguel Lopez de Legazpi during their conquest of Manila in 1571. As for the beginnings of the Catholic institution in the town, Hagonoy was said to have been established as a visita of Calumpit as early as 1581 when Don Gonzalo Ronquillo de Peñalosa, then Governor General of the Philippines, handed over Hagonoy to Sargento Juan Moron to be included in Encomienda of Calumpit. Juan Moron later handed over his jurisdiction over Hagonoy to Fray Diego de Ordoñez de Vivar and the priest establish Hagonoy as one of the visitas of Convento de Calumpit. Proof of the establishment of the visita of Hagonoy can be found on the documents from a private meeting of the Augustinian dated January 17, 1582, with Fray Diego Ordoñez de Vivar as signatory for Hagonoy. Another meeting on September 21 of the same year 1582, confirms the existence of the convent of Hagonoy with Fray Diego Vivar as its first minister.

Edifice history
Fray Diego Ordoñez de Vivar erected parochial structures made of lights materials in barrio Quinabalon (now Barangay Santa Monica) and placed it under the guidance of Saint Anne. From 1731 to 1734, a stone and brick church was built by Fray Juan Albarràn, possibly still on the Brgy. Santa Monica site. The said church was razed by fire on August 12, 1748. As for the present church, its foundations were laid in 1747 on its current site in Barrio Sto Niño during the time of Fray Eusebio Polo. The site was moved to its present location due to flooding on the former site. Fray Buenaventura Roldán completed the church in 1752. Another church was said to have been built from 1815 to 1836 by Fray Juan Coronado. The said church was razed by fire in 1856, which also damaged 30 houses in the town center. Fray Manuel Alvarez, appointed as parish priest in 1862, started building another church, bigger than the previous ones to accommodate a larger number of people. Besides the expansion of the church, its design was also remodeled into one that was described as unique for that era. The church walls were partially damaged by an earthquake in 1871, and repairs followed soon after it under the leadership of Fray Ignacio Manzanares. Secular priest from Archidiocese of Manila has started to administered the church in 1900 upon the evacuation of Augustinian order due to Filipino Revolution against Spain. Church renovations were done in 1936 and 1961 (the year when the porte-cochere was added by Father Celestino Rodriquez). Gradual renovations continued from 1968 to 1970 under Monsignor Jose B. Aguinaldo. The present façade, with the predominant images of saint resting atop the pilasters is attributed to him.

Architecture
Prior to the Mid-20th century renovation, the church façade is bare of ornamentation save for volutes founds on the end of the imaginary triangular pediment, circular reliefs and buttress-like pilasters capped with roof tiles. The façade is pierced with 5 windows: three semicircular arched ones and two rectangular ones on the first level. A porte-cochere with a balustraded top mars the view of the bottom part of the façade. Much of the design of the façade has been changed after the 1970s renovation. The façade now sports three arched entrances, all featuring hardwood doors carved with great details. Tuscan capitals were incorporated into the four pilasters and were now capped off with huge images of Augustinian saints. A rose window and a tableau of Saint Anne and the Virgin Mary were also added into the center of the pediment. The entire façade is capped off with a cross held by two cherubs. To the left of the church rises the six-level rectangular bell tower. Originally a five level tower, a sixth level and a cupola was added during the latest reconstruction of the church. The bell tower is bare of detailed ornamentation except for the balustraded semicircular arch windows and buttresses placed at the corners of the tower.

See also
Other declared national shrines under the Roman Catholic Diocese of Malolos:
 National Shrine of the Divine Mercy
 National Shrine of Our Lady of Fatima
Parish of San Pascual Baylon and National Shrine of Nuestra Señora Inmaculada Concepcion de Salambao

References

External links
 
 Archival Photos of the National Shrine of Saint Anne from the Filipinas Heritage Library

Spanish Colonial architecture in the Philippines
Roman Catholic churches in Bulacan
Baroque architecture in the Philippines
Roman Catholic national shrines in the Philippines
Churches in the Roman Catholic Diocese of Malolos